Otitoma kecil is a species of sea snail, a marine gastropod mollusk in the family Pseudomelatomidae, the turrids and allies.

Description
The length of the shell attains 5.5 mm.

Distribution
This marine species occurs off Indonesia

References

 Sysoev, A. V. (1997). Mollusca Gastropoda: New deep-water turrid gastropods (Conoidea) from eastern Indonesia. in: Crosnier, A. et al. (Ed.) Résultats des Campagnes MUSORSTOM 16. Campagne Franco-Indonésienne KARUBAR. Mémoires du Muséum national d'Histoire naturelle. Série A, Zoologie. 172: 325-356

External links
 Gastropods.com: Otitoma kecil
  Tucker, J.K. 2004 Catalog of recent and fossil turrids (Mollusca: Gastropoda). Zootaxa 682:1-1295
  Morassi M., Nappo A. & Bonfitto A. (2017). New species of the genus Otitoma Jousseaume, 1898 (Pseudomelatomidae, Conoidea) from the Western Pacific Ocean. European Journal of Taxonomy. 304: 1-30
 Kilburn R.N. (2004) The identities of Otitoma and Antimitra (Mollusca: Gastropoda: Conidae and Buccinidae). African Invertebrates, 45: 263-270

kecil
Gastropods described in 1997